Biribi, biribissi (in Italian), or cavagnole (in French), was an Italian game of chance similar to roulette, played for low stakes, that was banned in 1837. It was played on a board on which the numbers 1 to 70 are marked.

The players put their stakes on the numbers they wish to back. The banker is provided with a bag from which he draws a case containing a ticket, the tickets corresponding with the numbers on the board. The banker calls out the number, and any players who backed it receive sixty-four times their stake; all other stakes go to the banker.

Casanova played it in Genoa (illegally, for it was already banned there) and the South of France in the 1760s, and describes it as "a regular cheats' game". He broke the bank (fairly, he claims) and was immediately rumored to have been in collusion with the bag-holder; such collusion, presumably, was common.

In the French army, "to be sent to Biribi" was a cant term for being sent to the disciplinary battalions in Algeria.

References

Gambling games